Marmorie, or Marmor, ("dapple") is the warhorse of Grandoyne, one of the Saracens in the French epic, The Song of Roland. Marmorie is mentioned in laisse 122 of the poem.

References

Matter of France
Individual warhorses
Fictional horses